Admiral Sir Edward Belcher  (27 February 1799 – 18 March 1877) was a British naval officer, hydrographer, and explorer. Born in Nova Scotia, he was the great-grandson of Jonathan Belcher, who served as a colonial governor of Massachusetts, New Hampshire, and New Jersey.

Biography

Early life
Belcher was born in Halifax, Nova Scotia, the second son of Andrew Belcher and entered the Royal Navy in 1812.

Surveys
In 1825, he accompanied Frederick William Beechey's expedition to the Pacific and Bering Strait as a surveyor. Belcher took up the work which Beechey had left unfinished on the Pacific coast of South America. He was on board , which was ordered to return to England in 1839 via the Trans-Pacific route. Belcher made various observations at a number of islands which he visited, having been delayed by being despatched to take part in the war in China in 1840.

On 25 January 1841, Commander Belcher landed on Possession Point at the north shore Hong Kong Island and made the first British survey of Hong Kong harbour. After the war's end in 1842 he reached home and for his services was made a Knight Bachelor in the following year.

Arctic expedition
In 1852 Belcher led the last and largest Admiralty expedition to attempt to find and rescue Sir John Franklin. He was also to look for his former surveying officer in Hong Kong, Sir Richard Collinson, and Sir Robert McClure, whose ships had not been seen after entering the Bering Strait. He did a great deal of sledge exploration, rescued McClure and abandoned four of his five ships in the ice.

He had five ships:  (Belcher),  (Henry Kellett, second mate George Nares), the steam tenders Pioneer (Sherard Osborn) and Intrepid (Sir Leopold McClintock) and the depot ship  (William Pullen). Belcher and one tender were to enter the Wellington Channel, between Cornwallis Island and Devon Island, where Franklin was thought to be, while Kellett was to go west to Melville Island and look for Collinson and McClure. North Star was to stay at Beechey Island as a supply base.

He left the Nore in April 1852. By early winter Assistance and Pioneer were frozen in at Northumberland Sound to the north of Wellington Channel while Resolute and Intrepid were frozen in off Melville Island —the first ships this far West since Sir William Edward Parry in 1819. A great deal of exploration was done by manhauled sledges. In April 1853 Leopold McClintock and others left Resolute on sledges and returned 105 days later, having covered  and discovered Prince Patrick Island.

Another party went West and discovered Robert McClure, whose ship was frozen in at Mercy Bay. Belcher went north by sledge and found a channel at the northern tip of Devon Island, hinting that Franklin might have used it to escape to Baffin Bay. When the ice broke up that summer, he pushed his ships up Wellington Channel and became trapped again.

By February 1854, Belcher was becoming increasingly worried about the safety of his ships and men. In April he ordered Kellett to abandon his ships and return by sledge to North Star. Belcher abandoned his two ships in late July. Aided by two ships that showed up at Beechey Island ( and ), the whole party returned to England. Belcher went through a court martial, which was automatic for any captain who had lost a ship.

He was exonerated, but his sword was returned to him "without observation". He never again received an active command. Curiously Resolute broke free of the ice and drifted all the way to Davis Strait, where it was picked up by an American whaler. The American government graciously returned the ship to the United Kingdom, and when many years later the ship was broken up, its timbers were used to make a desk for the American president by way of a thank you. This Resolute desk, a gift from Queen Victoria, is still used today in the Oval Office.

Despite his achievements, Belcher would later be described by a Hydrographer of the Navy as “a tyrannical martinet who made every ship he commanded a floating hell.”

Later life
Following his last active service, Belcher was appointed Knight Commander of the Order of the Bath in 1867, and an admiral in 1872.

Personal life 
He was briefly married to Diana Jolliffe, stepdaughter of Captain Peter Heywood; that marriage ending upon her application for legal separation for his having infected her with venereal disease.

Legacy 
Belcher is commemorated in Hong Kong through Belcher's Street, Belcher Bay and The Belcher's in Kennedy Town. His name is also commemorated in the Belcher Islands, in the Canadian Arctic. He is also commemorated with a plaque in the Admiralty Garden, CFB Halifax.

A highly venomous seasnake, Hydrophis belcheri, is also named in his honour. Belcher collected the holotype which is housed in the Natural History Museum, London.

Works
 Treatise on Nautical Surveying (1835)
 Narrative of a Voyage Round the World (1843). (Vol. 1 / Vol. 2).
 Narrative of the Voyage of H.M.S. Samarang, During the Years 1843–46 (1848). (Vol. 1 / Vol. 2).
 The Last of the Arctic Voyages (1855). (Vol. 1 / Vol. 2).
 Horatio Howard Brenton (1856). (Vol. 1 / Vol. 2 / Vol. 3).

See also
 European and American voyages of scientific exploration

Notes

References

External links 

 
 
 
 
 Edward Belcher Notebook, 1860 at Dartmouth College Library

1799 births
1877 deaths
British polar explorers
Canadian people of Dutch descent
Canadian people of English descent
Explorers of Canada
Explorers of the Arctic
Knights Bachelor
Knights Commander of the Order of the Bath
English hydrographers
Persons of National Historic Significance (Canada)
Royal Navy admirals
Royal Navy personnel of the Napoleonic Wars